Dana Glacier may refer to:

Dana Glacier (Antarctica)
Dana Glacier (California), in the Sierra Nevada, California
Dana Glacier (Washington), in the North Cascades, Washington